The 2022–23 All-Ireland Senior Club Football Championship was the 52nd staging of the All-Ireland Senior Club Football Championship, the Gaelic Athletic Association's premier inter-county club Gaelic football tournament. The draws for the respective provincial championships took place at various stages between June and September 2022. The championship ran from 22 October 2022 to 22 January 2023.

Kilcoo entered the championship as the defending champions, however, they were beaten by Glen in the Ulster final.

Kilmacud Crokes won the championship, defeating Glen by 1-11 to 1-09 in the All-Ireland final at Croke Park.

Kilmacud Crokes finished the game with an extra player on the pitch, causing significant controversy. The GAA ordered a replay of the final after Glen lodged an objection. However after Kilmacud Crokes lodged an appeal against a replay, Glen withdrew from the appeals process, saying that they "do not believe the conditions exist for a replay", resulting in Kilmacud retaining their title.

Teams

Connacht Senior Club Football Championship

Connacht quarter-finals

Connacht semi-finals

Connacht final

Leinster Senior Club Football Championship

Leinster first round

Leinster quarter-finals

Leinster semi-finals

Leinster final

Munster Senior Club Football Championship

Munster quarter-finals

Munster semi-finals

Munster final

Ulster Senior Club Football Championship

Ulster preliminary round

Ulster quarter-finals

Ulster semi-finals

Ulster final

All-Ireland Senior Club Football Championship

All-Ireland semi-finals

All-Ireland final

Championship statistics

Top scorers

Overall

In a single game

Miscellaneous

 The Downs qualified for the Leinster final for the first time in 50 years.
 Glen won the Ulster Championship for the first time.
Kerins O'Rahilly's won the Munster Championship for the first time.
Moycullen won the Connacht Championship for the first time.

References

2022 GAA Football Club Championships
All-Ireland Senior Club Football Championship